Slade is a small village and townland in County Wexford, Ireland. Slade has historically been a fishing port, and was defended by Slade Castle from the late 15th century. In the south of the townland, there is evidence of an earlier ringfort. The harbour in Slade village was extended in the mid-19th century and built upon piers dating from at least the 17th century. A salt-house was built here in the 17th century, to salt (preserve) the fish landed in the harbour. There is a small beach next to the harbour, and Hook Sub Aqua Club (a scuba diving
club) is based nearby.

References

External links
 
 Slade Castle on megalithicireland.com

Townlands of County Wexford
Towns and villages in County Wexford